Pityeja histrionaria is a moth of the family Geometridae first described by Gottlieb August Wilhelm Herrich-Schäffer in 1853. It is found in Central and South America, where it has been recorded from Costa Rica, Honduras, Ecuador and Venezuela.

The larvae have been recorded feeding on Myrsine coriacea.

References

Moths of Central America
Moths described in 1853
Hemileucinae